Battaristis is a genus of moths in the family Gelechiidae.

Species
Battaristis acroglypta Meyrick, 1929
Battaristis amphiscolia Meyrick, 1914
Battaristis ardiophora Meyrick, 1914
Battaristis atelesta Meyrick, 1914
Battaristis bistrigella (Busck, 1914)
Battaristis concinusella (Chambers, 1877)
Battaristis concisa Meyrick, 1929
Battaristis coniosema Meyrick, 1922
Battaristis curtella (Busck, 1914)
Battaristis cyclella (Busck, 1903)
Battaristis emissurella (Walker, 1864)
Battaristis ichnota Meyrick, 1914
Battaristis melanamba Meyrick, 1914
Battaristis nigratomella (Clemens, 1863)
Battaristis orthocampta Meyrick, 1914
Battaristis parazela Meyrick, 1929
Battaristis pasadenae (Keifer, 1935)
Battaristis perinaeta (Walsingham, 1910)
Battaristis prismatopa Meyrick, 1914
Battaristis rhythmodes Meyrick, 1929
Battaristis sphenodelta Meyrick, 1922
Battaristis stereogramma Meyrick, 1914
Battaristis symphora (Walsingham, 1911)
Battaristis syngraphopa Meyrick, 1922
Battaristis synocha Meyrick, 1922
Battaristis tricentrota Meyrick, 1931
Battaristis unistrigella (Busck, 1914)
Battaristis vittella (Busck, 1916)

External links

 
Anacampsini